Elizabeth Phelan (January 11, 1920 – July 22, 2016) was an American politician in the state of Wyoming. She served in the Wyoming House of Representatives as a member of the Democratic Party. She attended Laramie County Community College and worked in the real estate business.

References

1920 births
2016 deaths
Politicians from Casper, Wyoming
Businesspeople from Wyoming
Women state legislators in Wyoming
Democratic Party members of the Wyoming House of Representatives
20th-century American women politicians
20th-century American politicians
20th-century American businesspeople
21st-century American women